Gary Sanctuary is a British pianist, keyboard player, composer and in-demand session musician. He has recorded and toured with a number of well-known musicians, including Michael McDonald, George Benson, Chaka Khan, Maxi Priest, Aztec Camera, Beverley Craven, Terence Trent D'Arby, Jaki Graham, and Terry Callier. He has also been a long-term collaborator with Jean-Paul 'Bluey' Maunick and Incognito. Between 2010 and 2013, he toured with the Three Friends band, formed by guitarist Gary Green and drummer Malcom Mortimore, former members of the progressive chamber rock band, Gentle Giant.

References

External links 
 Gary Sanctuary's full discography

British rock keyboardists
Living people
Aztec Camera members
Year of birth missing (living people)
Incognito (band) members